Bluebell Lakes are a series of five fishing lakes in Tansor near Peterborough. The five lakes are Kingfisher, Swan, Bluebell, Sandmartin and Mallard.

Benson died in 2009, aged 25.

References

Lakes of Northamptonshire
Northamptonshire articles missing geocoordinate data